The Madurai Metropolitan Area, is the 31st largest metropolitan area in India and is the third largest metropolitan area in the state of Tamil Nadu only next to Chennai and Coimbatore. The Madurai Metropolitan Area consists of the city of Madurai and its suburbs in Madurai district.

Composition 
The Madurai urban agglomeration is a metropolitan area in Tamil Nadu state, consisting of the city of Madurai and its suburbs. It consists of a municipal corporation and suburban areas spread out in parts of Madurai district.

Municipal corporations 
Madurai City Municipal Corporation

Municipalities 
Tirumangalam
Melur
Thiruparankundram
Usilampatti
Avaniyapuram

Town Panchayats 
Vadipatti
Paravai
Vilangudi
Thirunagar
Sholavandan

Census Towns 
Kannanendal 
Melamadai 
Chinna Anuppanadi
Nagavakulam

Districts 
Madurai district (partial)

Taluks 
From Madurai district
Madurai-North (partial)
Madurai-South
Melur (partial)
Thirumangalam (partial)
Thiruparankundram
Vadipatti (partial)

Transport
The Regional Transport offices in the Madurai metropolitan area are TN-58 (Madurai South), TN-59 (Madurai North), and TN-64 (Madurai Central).

Madurai Metro Rail

In 2021,The Tamil Nadu Government  proposed a metro for the city of Madurai.

See also

 Chennai metropolitan area
 Coimbatore metropolitan area
 Salem metropolitan area 
 Tiruchirappalli metropolitan area
 List of million-plus urban agglomerations in India
 List of districts in Tamil Nadu by Human Development Index
 List of million-plus urban agglomerations in Tamilnadu

References 

Metropolitan areas of Tamil Nadu
Madurai